Niels Thiessen (born 27 January 1983) is a Belgian field hockey coach of the Belgian women's national team.

He coached the team at the 2018 Women's Hockey World Cup.

References

1983 births
Living people
Belgian field hockey coaches